Jean Bernard Jauréguiberry (26 August 1815 – 21 October 1887) was a French admiral and statesman.

Early life
A native of Bayonne, Jauréguiberry entered the French Navy in 1831.  He became a lieutenant in 1845, a commander in 1856, and a captain in 1860.  After serving in the Crimea and in China, and being governor of Senegal, he was promoted to rear admiral in 1869.

Jauréguiberry served in the Crimean War as commander of the gunboat Grenade, distinguishing himself at the capture of Kinburn on 17 October 1855.  He was twice commended for his conduct in orders of the day.

He served on land during the second part of the Franco-Prussian War, in the rank of auxiliary general of division. He was present at the battles of Coulmiers, Villepion and Loigny-Poupry, in command of a division, and in Chanzy's retreat upon Le Mans and the battle at that place in command of a corps.

Later naval career
Jauréguiberry had been amongst the most distinguished French naval officers in the military campaigns of the period. On 9 December he had been made vice admiral, and in 1871 he commanded the fleet at Toulon; in 1875 he was a member of the council of admiralty; and in October 1876 he was appointed to command the evolutionary squadron in the Mediterranean.

In February 1879 he became minister of the navy in the Waddington cabinet, and on 27 May following was elected a senator for life. He was again minister of the navy in the Freycinet cabinet in 1880. A fine example of the fighting French seaman of his time, Jaureguiberry died at Paris in October 1887.

Legacy
Two French ships have been named in the admiral's honour, the pre-dreadnought battleship , in service from 1897 to 1919, and the fleet escort , in service from 1958 to 1977.

Notes

References
 Tréfeu, E., Nos marins: vice-amiraux, contre-amiraux, officiers généraux des troupes de la marine et des corps entretenus (Paris, 1888)
Attribution

External links
netmarine.net - Biography of Jauréguiberry 

1815 births
1887 deaths
People from Bayonne
French Calvinist and Reformed Christians
Politicians from Nouvelle-Aquitaine
Orléanists
Ministers of Marine and the Colonies
Members of the National Assembly (1871)
French life senators
Colonial Governors of French Sénégal
French Navy admirals
French military personnel of the Crimean War
French military personnel of the Second Opium War
French military personnel of the Franco-Prussian War
Burials at Montparnasse Cemetery
Governors of Cochinchina